Stefan Jovanović (born 7 April 1994) is a Serbian football right-back who plays for Napredak Kruševac.

Club career
Born in Kraljevo, Jovanović came throw the Sloga Kraljevo youth academy. He started his senior career with Bane in the 2013–14 season and later he moved to Zvižd, where he stayed until the end of 2015. At the beginning of 2016, Jovanović joined Železničar Lajkovac for the rest of 2015–16 season. In summer same year, Jovanović signed with the Serbian First League side Radnički Pirot. After a half-season with the club, Jovanović moved to Zemun during the winter-break.

On 4 June 2021, he signed a two-year contract with Napredak Kruševac.

Career statistics

References

1994 births
Living people
Sportspeople from Kraljevo
Association football defenders
Serbian footballers
FK Sloga Kraljevo players
FK Bane players
FK Železničar Lajkovac players
FK Radnički Pirot players
FK Zemun players
FK Mladost Lučani players
OFK Bačka players
FK Proleter Novi Sad players
FK Napredak Kruševac players
Serbian First League players
Serbian SuperLiga players